Zorana "Lola" Novaković (25 April 1935 – 3 April 2016) was a Serbian singer, hugely popular during the 1960s and to a lesser degree the 1970s. She was born in  Belgrade, Kingdom of Yugoslavia. She represented FPR Yugoslavia at the Eurovision Song Contest in 1962, where she finished fourth.

In 1962, she starred in Šeki snima, pazi se, a full-length comedy inspired by the public persona of football sensation Dragoslav Šekularac.

She died on 3 April 2016, a few weeks before her 81st birthday.

References

External links

1935 births
2016 deaths
Eurovision Song Contest entrants of 1962
Singers from Belgrade
Yugoslav women singers
Eurovision Song Contest entrants for Yugoslavia